Carpenters Corner may refer to:

 Carpenters Corner, Delaware, U.S.
 An unincorporated community in Pennington County, Minnesota, U.S.
 A section of the Top Gear test track, Surrey, U.K.